The 1998–99 Campionato Sammarinese di Calcio season was the 14th season since its establishment. It was contested by 16 teams, and S.C. Faetano won the championship.

Regular season

Group A

Group B

Results
All teams play twice against the teams within their own group and once against the teams from the other group.

Championship playoffs

First round
F.C. Domagnano 1–0 S.C. Faetano
S.P. Tre Penne 1–3 S.S. Cosmos

Second round
S.S. Folgore/Falciano 2–1 S.S. Cosmos
S.S. Murata 2–3 F.C. Domagnano

Third round
S.S. Murata 2–3 S.P. Tre Penne
S.S. Cosmos 1–2 S.C. Faetano

Fourth round
F.C. Domagnano 3–3 (pen 6–7) S.S. Folgore/Falciano
S.P. Tre Penne 1–2 S.C. Faetano

Semifinals
F.C. Domagnano 1–1 (pen 1–4) S.C. Faetano

Final
S.C. Faetano 1–0 S.S. Folgore/Falciano

References
San Marino – List of final tables (RSSSF)

Campionato Sammarinese di Calcio
San Marino
1998–99 in San Marino football